Wael Nazha (born 26 March 1974) is a Lebanese former footballer who played as a forward.

Early life 
Nazha was born in Monrovia, Liberia to a Lebanese father and a Liberian mother.

Club career
Nazha began playing football in Liberia; he continued his football career in Nabi Osman in Lebanon, then joining Labweh's local club in Baalbek. In 1987, Nazha joined Racing Beirut, then moved to Tadamon Sour in 1989. He eventually joined Beirut-based side Nejmeh.

Nazha spent one season playing for Kavala in the Greek Alpha Ethniki. He finished his career in the lower levels of English football, playing for Emley, Bradford (Park Avenue), Ossett Town, Droylsden, Wakefield, and Frickley.

International career
Nazha has made at least 45 appearances—official and unofficial—for the Lebanon national team, and has scored eight official goals between 1993 and 1998.

Career statistics

International
Scores and results list Lebanon's goal tally first, score column indicates score after each Nazha goal.

Honours
Nejmeh
 Lebanese Elite Cup: 1998

Bradford Park Avenue
 Northern Premier League First Division: 2000–01

Eastwood Town
 Nottinghamshire Senior Cup: 2003–04
 Northern Counties East Football League President's Cup: 2003–04

Individual
 IFFHS All-time Lebanon Men's Dream Team
 Lebanese Premier League Team of the Season: 1996–97, 1997–98

See also
 List of Lebanon international footballers born outside Lebanon

References

External links
 
 

1974 births
Living people
Sportspeople from Monrovia
Lebanese footballers
Lebanese people of Liberian descent
Liberian people of Lebanese descent
Sportspeople of Liberian descent
Sportspeople of Lebanese descent
Association football forwards
Racing Club Beirut players
Tadamon Sour SC players
Nejmeh SC players
Kavala F.C. players
Emley A.F.C. players
Bradford (Park Avenue) A.F.C. players
Ossett Town F.C. players
Droylsden F.C. players
Wakefield F.C. players
Eastwood Town F.C. players
Frickley Athletic F.C. players
Lebanese Premier League players
Lebanese Second Division players
Super League Greece players
Northern Premier League players
Northern Counties East Football League players
Lebanon international footballers
Lebanese expatriate footballers
Lebanese expatriate sportspeople in Greece
Lebanese expatriate sportspeople in England
Expatriate footballers in Greece
Expatriate footballers in England